The Vandal Stakes was a Canadian Thoroughbred horse race run annually from 1956 through 2016 at Woodbine Racetrack in Toronto, Ontario. The race has been on hiatus since the 2016 edition. The sprint race was open to two-year-old horses bred in Ontario. In 2016, the distance was changed to  furlongs and the surface was changed to turf. It currently offers a purse of $150,000.

The Vandal Stakes was hosted by Fort Erie Racetrack from 1970 through 1985. In 1961, it was run in two divisions. Since inception in 1956 the race has been run at various distances:
 5 furlongs : 2006
 5.5 furlongs : 1956-1957, 1959, 1967
 6 furlongs : 1958, 1960, 1968-1969 1986-2005, 2007–2015
 6.5 furlongs : 1962-1966, 1970-1985, 2016
 7 furlongs : 1961

Prior to 2016, the race was held on the main track, which was a Polytrack synthetic dirt surface from 2006 to 2015 and a natural dirt surface before then. As of 2016, the race is held on the turf.

Historical race notes
The great Northern Dancer finished second in the 1963 running of the Vandal Stakes but went on to win the following years Kentucky Derby. 1967 winner Dancer's Image also went on to win the Derby.

Records
Speed record: (At current distance of six furlongs)
 1:09.64 - Ghost Fleet (2009)

Most wins by a jockey:
 9 - David Clark (1982, 1987, 1991, 1996, 2001, 2003, 2005, 2007, 2008)

Most wins by a trainer:
 4 - Gil Rowntree (1969, 1975, 1978, 1990)

Most wins by an owner:
 3 - Stafford Farms (1969, 1975, 1978)

Winners

References

 The Vandal Stakes at Pedigree Query
 The 2009 Vandal Stakes at Woodbine Entertainment

Discontinued horse races
Restricted stakes races in Canada
Flat horse races for two-year-olds
Recurring sporting events established in 1956
Woodbine Racetrack
Sport in Toronto